Nicola Wilson (née Tweddle, born 1 October 1976) is a British equestrian rider specialising in three-day eventing. Riding Opposition Buzz, she won a team gold at the 2010 FEI World Equestrian Games and team silver at the 2012 Olympic Games. She is also a seven-time medallist at the European Championships, including team golds in 2009, 2017 and 2021 and individual gold and bronze in 2021 and 2017, respectively.

Early life
Born in Darlington, Wilson was given her first pony when she was three years old and later joined Hurworth Pony Club, where she competed in various pony club events and later became a member of the Bedale Hunt. Wilson studied for a degree in Sport and Business Management at Manchester University, and graduated with a 2:1 in 1999.

Career
Wilson first competed internationally at the 1997 Young Rider European Championships, where she rode Mr Bumble. Riding the same horse she finished in 10th place at the 2008 Burghley Horse Trials. In 2007, she began competing on Opposition Buzz, a horse owned by Rosemary Search.

She won a gold medal as part of the British eventing team at the 2009 European Eventing Championships in Fontainebleau, France; she finished ninth in the individual event with 64.7 faults. Alongside William Fox-Pitt, Mary King and Tina Cook, Wilson was part of the British team that won the team eventing gold medal at the 2010 FEI World Equestrian Games held at the Kentucky Horse Park in Lexington, United States; Wilson rode a clear round in the show jumping meaning teammate, and individual silver medallist Fox-Pitt could have afforded three fences down and Britain would still have won team gold. Wilson and Opposition Buzz finished 16th overall in the individual competition.
 
At the 2011 Badminton Horse Trials, Wilson, riding Opposition Buzz, was the leading British rider, and in third place overall, heading into the last day of competition. During the show jumping phase she knocked down a fence and eventually finished seventh in a competition won by Mark Todd. She won a bronze medal at the 2011 European Eventing Championships as the British side finished behind Germany and France.

Wilson was initially selected as a reserve rider for Great Britain at the 2012 Summer Olympics but was added to the squad for the individual and team eventing when Piggy French withdrew after her horse DHI Topper W suffered an injury. Wilson's horse for the Games was Opposition Buzz. The events were held at Greenwich Park between 28 and 31 July.

CCI 5* Results

International Championship results

Notable Horses 

 Opposition Buzz - 1997 Dark Bay Trakehner Cross Gelding (Fleetwater Opposition x Java Tiger)
 2009 European Championships - Team Gold Medal, Individual Ninth Place
 2010 World Equestrian Games - Team Gold Medal, Individual 15th Place
 2011 European Championships - Team Bronze Medal, Individual 16th Place
 2012 London Olympics - Team Silver Medal, Individual 28th Place
 Annie Clover - 2004 Brown Irish Sport Horse Mare (Newmarket Venture x Clover Hill)
 2014 World Equestrian Games - Individual 24th Place
 One Two Many - 2002 Bay Irish Sport Horse Gelding (Chacoa x Colin Diamond)
 2015 European Championships - Team Silver Medal, Individual 27th Place
 Bulana - 2006 Black Dutch Warmblood Mare (Tygo x Furore)
 2017 European Championships - Team Gold Medal, Individual Bronze Medal

References 

British event riders
Equestrians at the 2012 Summer Olympics
Olympic equestrians of Great Britain
British female equestrians
1976 births
Living people
Sportspeople from Darlington
Alumni of the University of Manchester
Olympic silver medallists for Great Britain
Olympic medalists in equestrian
Medalists at the 2012 Summer Olympics